This is a non-exhaustive list of popular OpenGL programs. Many programs that use OpenGL are games.

Games developed in OpenGL
 Ballenger, a Platformer
 Cube 2: Sauerbraten, an open source 3D FPS and also a game engine
 Doom (2016 video game), a FPS
 Minecraft, a famous sandbox video game

Photography and video 
 Adobe After Effects, a digital motion graphics and compositing software
 Adobe Photoshop, a popular photo and graphics editing software
 Adobe Premiere Pro, a real-time, timeline based video editing software application
 ArtRage, traditional media painting software
 Kodi, a cross-platform, open source media center

Modeling and CAD 
 3D Studio Max, modeling, animation and rendering package
 Autodesk AutoCAD, 2D/3D CAD
 Autodesk Maya, modeling, animation, sculpting, and rendering package that uses its own scripting language, MEL
 Blender, 3D CAD, animation and game engine
 Cadence Allegro, Computer-aided design, Electronics
 Houdini, modeling, animation, effects, rendering and compositing package developed by Side Effects Software
 LARSA4D, structural analysis program
 Modo (software), high-end 3D modeling, animation, rigging, rendering and visual effects package
 Rhinoceros, NURBS Modeling for Windows
 SAP2000, structural analysis program
 Scilab, Mathematical tool, clone of MATLAB
 SketchUp, easy to use 3D modeler
 VirtualMec, 3D CAD for the Meccano construction system

Visualization and miscellaneous 
 Algodoo, a freeware 2D physics simulator
 Avogadro, a 3D molecular viewer and editor
 BALLView, an interactive 3D visualizations software
 Celestia, a FOSS interactive and extremely modifiable 3D space simulator and planetarium
 Enhanced Machine Controller (EMC2), G-code interpreter for CNC machines
 Google Earth, an extremely high-quality interactive simulation of almost the entire Earth, using data from the ground as well as satellite imagery
 InVesalius, a cross-platform software, visualization medical images and reconstruction
 Mari (software), 3D texturing and painting software
 PyMOL, a 3D molecular viewer
 QuteMol, a 3D molecular renderer
 Really Slick Screensavers, 3D Screensavers
 SpaceEngine, a 3D interactive planetarium program that uses real data and procedural generation to fill in the gaps
 OpenUniverse, a 3D interactive planetarium program originally made by JPL in 1997 under the name "Solar System Simulator", later improved by Raúl Alonso Álvarez and released to the public under the name "OpenUniverse" in 2000
 Stellarium, a high quality planetarium program
 Universe Sandbox, an interactive space-oriented physics simulator
 Vectorworks, a cross-platform Mac/Windows 2D and 3D CAD for architectural & landscape design, offers a Renderworks module based on the Maxon CineRender engine
 Virtools, a real-time 3D engine
 Vizard, a platform for building and rendering enterprise and academic virtual reality applications developed by WorldViz

See also 
 List of OpenCL applications

 
Lists of software